The 2016 Florida Atlantic Owls football team represented Florida Atlantic University in the 2016 NCAA Division I FBS football season. The Owls played their home games at the FAU Stadium in Boca Raton, Florida, and competed in the East Division of Conference USA (C–USA). They were led by third-year head coach Charlie Partridge. They finished the season 3–9, 2–6 in C-USA play to finish in a tie for sixth place in the East Division.

On November 27, head coach Charlie Partridge was fired. He finished at FAU with a three-year record of 9–27. On December 13, the school hired Lane Kiffin as head coach.

Schedule
Florida Atlantic announced its 2016 football schedule on February 4, 2016. The 2016 schedule consists of 6 home and away games in the regular season. The Owls will host C–USA foes Charlotte, Old Dominion, UTEP, and Western Kentucky (WKU), and will travel to Florida International (FIU), Marshall, Middle Tennessee, and Rice.

The team will play four non–conference games, two home games against Ball State from the Mid-American Conference (MAC) and Southern Illinois from the Missouri Valley Football Conference, and two road games against Kansas State from the Big 12 Conference and Miami from the Atlantic Coast Conference.

The game between Florida Atlantic and Charlotte on October 8, 2016, has been postponed due to Hurricane Matthew. The game is tentatively rescheduled the following day on October 9, 2016 with a noon kickoff.
Schedule Source:

Game summaries

Southern Illinois

at Miami (FL)

at Kansas State

Ball State

at FIU

Charlotte

at Marshall

WKU

at Rice

UTEP

Old Dominion

at Middle Tennessee

References

Florida Atlantic
Florida Atlantic Owls football seasons
Florida Atlantic Owls football